The Rovers Return Inn is a fictional pub in the long-running British soap opera Coronation Street.

The Rovers Return occupies a corner of the fictional Coronation Street and Rosamund Street set location in the show. The pub was built by the fictional brewery Newton and Ridley. In the programme, the Rovers Return Inn has been a free house since 1995, although the brewery continues to supply it. The name comes from the Ye Olde Rovers Return in Withy Grove, Manchester, a 14th-century building that became a licensed public house but ceased to be so in 1924 and was demolished in 1958.

The fictional pub has had three in-universe layouts. The original layout generally consisted of the style of a public bar. The fictional pub was later destroyed after a fire, caused by character Jack Duckworth. Later, the original layout was replaced by a single bar, until once again, being destroyed by a fire.

History of the pub
The Rovers Return Inn opened in 1902 on the newly built Coronation Street (1902 being Coronation year for Edward VII). It was originally to be called The Coronation, but the brewery was forced to change the name as the go-ahead had already been given for the street to be named Coronation Street. When Lieutenant Philip Ridley returned from active service in the Boer War, the pub was named in his honour. 

In 1918, to celebrate the return of the soldiers from World War I, the apostrophe was removed, thus making it The Rovers Return. When Coronation Street began in 1960, the signage of the pub read "The Rovers Return" but at some point, was changed to read "Rovers Return Inn", without a "The". Albert Tatlock (Jack Howarth) was among the World War I veterans who were still living in the street when the first episode was aired and continued to live there for more than 20 years afterwards.

Originally, the pub was divided into three separate bars: the public bar, the snug (usually inhabited by unaccompanied ladies, where drinks were half a penny cheaper) and the select (where drinks were more expensive but were served by a waitress).  As late as 1960, the ruling in the pub was that ladies were not allowed to remain at the bar after being served. These archaic rules were dropped soon afterwards. When the pub was damaged by an accidental fire in 1986, the three bars were knocked into one large room.

The living quarters downstairs bear no resemblance to the exterior set of the pub. In reality, the living room (the "backroom") would be in the middle of the street at the side of the pub, outside the medical centre. 

Since 1960 the toilet and cellar doors on the other side of the building would seem to enter the Barlow's kitchen, next door at number one Coronation Street. There is also no obvious room for a commercial kitchen, despite the lunchtime serving of Betty Williams' (Betty Driver) noted hotpot while she was a barmaid at the pub.

Since 2008, viewers have seen scenes in a kitchen/dining room in the upstairs of the pub (for use by the licensee/residents), although no other characters had ever used or referred to this room previously. A mock-up of the snug was a feature of the Granada Studios Tour.

The set's exterior doors are narrower than the doors on the interior set. This has always been the case as the exterior set is reduced in scale.

  In early 2008, the Rovers Return was redecorated, giving it a fresh look more than 20 years after the refurbishment which followed the fire of 1986. It received new wallpaper, re-upholstered seating, new flooring and new light fittings. A smoking shelter was built, which is accessed by a new door in the main pub area. This door has not been seen on screen.

Since that makeover in February 2008, the wallpaper was changed again in October 2008, making its on-screen debut on 17 October 2008. The producers were dissatisfied with the choice of wallpaper in February 2008. The new wallpaper is similar to the wallpaper used after the 1986 fire which hung in The Rovers for 22 years.

The change of décor in February 2008 was a storyline in the show, in which Liz McDonald's (Beverley Callard) husband Vernon Tomlin (Ian Reddington) hired friends to redecorate. The new look of The Rovers in October 2008 was not explained in the story. A few weeks later, Emily Bishop (Eileen Derbyshire) commented to Jed Stone (Kenneth Cope) that the local pub had "recently" been redecorated.

Major events
The fictional timeline proceeds as follows:
 13 May 1964: Martha Longhurst (Lynne Carol) dies after suffering a heart attack in the snug of The Rovers.
 7 March 1979: A lorry crashes into The Rovers Return, injuring several people including Alf Roberts (Bryan Mosley), Mike Baldwin (Johnny Briggs) and Betty Turpin (Betty Driver). Deirdre Langton (Anne Kirkbride) panics because she left a young Tracy (Christabel Finch) sitting outside in her pram, but it emerges that she was kidnapped by Sally Norton (Yvonne Nicholson).
 18 June 1986: A faulty electricity box starts a fire in the pub, and the whole interior explodes. Bet Lynch (Julie Goodyear) is asleep upstairs, but is eventually rescued by Kevin Webster (Michael Le Vell).
 12 February 1993: Outside the pub, Lisa Duckworth (Caroline Milmoe) is run over by a speeding motorist while crossing the road. She is taken to hospital, but never regains consciousness and is pronounced dead a few days later.
 13 April 2001: Toyah Battersby (Georgia Taylor) is raped in the ginnel beside The Rovers by an unseen assailant who is later revealed to be Phil Simmonds (Jack Deam).
 10 April 2005: Tracy Barlow's (Kate Ford) biological father Ray Langton (Neville Buswell) dies of stomach cancer during a party to celebrate the second wedding of his ex-wife Deirdre Rachid (Anne Kirkbride) to Ken Barlow (William Roache).
 22 February 2008: Violet Wilson (Jenny Platt) gives birth to her son Dylan assisted by Marcus Dent (Charlie Condou).
 23 January 2012: During the wedding reception of Tracy Barlow (Kate Ford) and Steve McDonald (Simon Gregson), Steve's ex-wife Becky (Katherine Kelly) reveals that Tracy suffered a miscarriage the day before she blamed Becky for the miscarriage, thus meaning that Tracy was lying. Steve subsequently leaves Tracy.
 9 September 2012: Kirsty Soames (Natalie Gumede) goes into labour after a fight with barmaid Tina McIntyre (Michelle Keegan). She later gives birth to her daughter Ruby Dobbs in the back room.
 18 March 2013: In an attempt to frame Jason Grimshaw (Ryan Thomas) for arson, Karl Munro (John Michie) sets fire to The Rovers, leaving Stella Price (Michelle Collins) and Sunita Alahan (Shobna Gulati) hospitalised, and killing Toni Griffiths (Tara Moran) and later Sunita.
 26 May 2013: After telling Izzy Armstrong (Cherylee Houston) that Gary Windass (Mikey North) had made a pass at her, Tina McIntyre (Michelle Keegan) goes into labour with their child two months early.
 14 October 2013: After accusing barmaid Tina McIntyre (Michelle Keegan) of having an affair with her husband David (Jack P. Shepherd), Kylie Platt (Paula Lane) attacks her in The Rovers, leading to an explosive catfight. During the fight, Liz McDonald (Beverley Callard) returns to Coronation Street and announces that she is now co-owner of The Rovers.
 25 December 2013: A drunken Kylie Platt (Paula Lane) makes a pass at Rob Donovan (Marc Baylis) and ends up brawling with Tina McIntyre (Michelle Keegan) yet again outside of The Rovers.
 22 January 2014: Anna Windass (Debbie Rush) walks into The Rovers and reveals the news of Hayley Cropper's (Julie Hesmondhalgh) death to the regulars.
 27 May 2014: Peter Barlow (Chris Gascoyne) tells his wife Carla Connor (Alison King) about his affair with Tina McIntyre (Michelle Keegan) in the backroom. She storms into the pub, shouting that she wants to "kill" Tina. When Tina is later attacked and dies, Carla becomes the prime suspect.
 13 May 2015: Liz McDonald (Beverley Callard) is attacked by two thugs, but she is unaware that her partner Tony Stewart (Terence Maynard) arranged the horrific attack.
 21 October 2016: Following David Platt's (Jack P. Shepherd) horrific car accident on the street, an explosion caused by leaking petrol rips through the street and blows in The Rovers' windows, which also leaves Michelle Connor (Kym Marsh) in a state of shock.
 15 September 2017: Rita Tanner (Barbara Knox) publicly collapses at Jenny Bradley (Sally Ann Matthews) and Eva Price's (Catherine Tyldesley) joint hen party, as a result of a brain tumour.
 25 December 2019: Derek Milligan (Craige Els) storms into the pub armed with a shotgun and holds many residents hostage, including Gary Windass (Mikey North), Ali Neeson (James Burrows), Johnny Connor (Richard Hawley), Jenny Connor (Sally Ann Matthews), Rita Tanner (Barbara Knox), Izzy Armstrong (Cherylee Houston), Fiz Stape (Jennie McAlpine), Tyrone Dobbs (Alan Halsall), Seb Franklin (Harry Visinoni), Tracy McDonald (Kate Ford), Liz McDonald (Beverley Callard), Steve McDonald (Simon Gregson) and Emma Brooker (Alexandra Mardell). He later fights with Gary and Ali, before shooting outside to show the locals that the gun is in fact loaded, however the bullet hits Robert Preston (Tristan Gemmill), who is about to enter the pub. Robert later dies in hospital from the shooting.

Employees

Current staff

Previous staff

Incidents

Martha's death (1964)

Episode 357, transmitted: 13 May 1964

In 1964, the producership of Coronation Street was handed to young, enthusiastic Tim Aspinall. He immediately began to ring changes. Since it had been fully networked across the various ITV regions in 1960, Coronation Street had never been out of the top ten ratings of the week (that continues to this day, 61 years on).  However, competition came from the BBC (there were only two channels in those days, BBC Television and ITV – BBC 2 was to follow later that year).  The BBC placed their most popular comedy series such as Steptoe and Son opposite the programme.  In those pre-video recorder days, viewers were forced to choose what to watch, and, as a consequence, Coronation Street began to lose the rating war. It was decided, by Aspinall, that several "blockbuster" storylines would have to be staged, the most radical being the death of Martha Longhurst (Lynne Carol).

Despite being a nosy old gossip and, in the Mancunian dialect of the show was "... no better than she should be....", Martha was a highly popular character; thus, she was chosen to be killed off in a highly cynical bid to boost the ratings.

On the night of her death, the residents were gathered in The Rovers, singing songs and celebrating Frank Barlow's £5000 win on the Premium Bonds. Martha, on her way to Spain the next day, had been showing off her new passport, of which she was very proud. She began to feel faint and retreated to the Snug, away from the singing punters, all in tune with Ena Sharples (Violet Carson) on piano.

Feeling flushed she undid her top button, pushed off her beret, clutched her chest and collapsed onto the table. The regulars, with the impression she was drunk, came to see what was going on. Upon inspection, Len Fairclough (Peter Adamson) pronounced her dead. She had suffered a fatal heart attack at the table she had frequented for years. The punters left, leaving only the Walkers, lifelong friend Ena and the late Martha Longhurst.

Violet Carson, a highly accomplished pianist (she had played the piano on the BBC's long-running Children's Hour) kept her back to the camera as she played the song "Down at the Old Bull and Bush" as she was so upset by the storyline and didn't want the camera to see her tears.

That night saw the credits roll in silence for the very first time (something that would later become the norm whenever a character was "killed off"), with the rooftop scene replaced by a close up of the snug table that contained a sherry glass, a passport and Martha's famous NHS spectacles.

Lorry crash (1979)

Episode 1893, transmitted: 7 March 1979

Deirdre Langton (Anne Kirkbride) wheeled her young daughter Tracy (Christabel Finch) down to The Rovers in her pram. She was to see Annie Walker (Doris Speed) with regards to a knitting pattern. Knowing Annie's strict rules concerning children on licensed premises, Tracy was left outside in her pushchair.

No more than two minutes had passed as Deirdre and Annie spoke in the back room. Suddenly, their conversation was halted by the screeching of brakes followed by a terrible crash, which shook the pub. Annie froze but Deirdre rushed through the pub and outside where she had left Tracy. In that very spot was a 6-foot pile of timber. Accompanying the pile was a lorry, turned on its side and smoking from the crash. Deirdre hysterically pulled away from the wood screaming for Tracy.

Inside the pub, Alf Roberts (Bryan Mosley) had been sitting with friend, Len Fairclough (Peter Adamson) in front of the window. Alf lay unconscious as Len, whose own arm was broken, desperately tried to help him.

Ken Barlow (William Roache), having rushed across from the community centre, took control. Having realised the driver was dead, he began to help the distraught Deirdre who was still frantically clawing at the timber. Once the police had taken charge, and Deirdre had been taken away to be comforted by Emily Bishop (Eileen Derbyshire) and Ena Sharples (Violet Carson), the timber was eventually cleared from the shattered pub.

The story was concluded when Tracy was found not to be under the timber but had been snatched away moments before the pub was hit. The snatcher was a crazed young woman called Sally Norton (Yvonne Nicholson) who had become obsessed with Tracy. Mother and daughter were reunited later by the canal as Tracy was rushed to the arms of Deirdre. For Alf, the scars remained, and he underwent a personality change months after he returned from the hospital.

Fire (1986)

Episode 2631, Transmitted: 18 June 1986

During a sing-a-long night, when the guests stood around the piano, the lights in the pub had been flickering and cutting out all night. Much to the frustration of Bet Lynch (Julie Goodyear) and the rest of the punters. Jack Duckworth (Bill Tarmey), potman at the time, decided to fix the problem. Upon return, he was graciously thanked for solving the problem. However, he had replaced the fuse with a far stronger one, leaving the problem of a potential explosion. Bet retired to bed that night, having locked up. In the middle of the night, the inevitable happened; the fuse box exploded and started a fire. This scene was shown at the end of the previous episode, Episode 2630 on 16 June 1986, showing the fuse box showering sparks as it exploded, with flames licking out from a left over box of scotch whisky over the end credits.

The fire eventually took hold in the main bar area by the time young couple Kevin Webster (Michael Le Vell) and Sally Seddon (Sally Dynevor) returned from a rock concert in Sheffield at 5.30am. Noticing the smoke seeping out from under the Rovers door with the orange glow of the flames behind the glass, Sally alerted Kevin, gently whispering "Fire!". The street soon came alive as residents Percy Sugden (Bill Waddington) and Terry Duckworth (Nigel Pivaro) offered a helping hand. Immediately aware Bet was asleep in her bedroom and failing to wake her after banging the front doors to do so, Kevin acquired a ladder with the help of Percy and was able to reach the bedroom window. Ken Barlow (William Roache) phoned for the fire brigade, and moved the Barlows' orange Volkswagen Beetle under the viaduct, Jack doing the same with the Duckworth's Vauxhall Nova, to clear a space for the emergency services when they arrived. Emily Bishop (Eileen Derbyshire), Ivy Tilsley (Lynne Perrie) and Hilda Ogden (Jean Alexander) were others to join in with the rescue mission.

Inside, Bet had finally woken up, trying her beside lamp with no success, and raced out of the bedroom to crawl along the landing to her escape out of the pub, only to find her exit down the stairs blocked by flames that leapt up at her from the hallway. She released a blood-curdling scream and ran back into the bedroom, slamming the door behind her and slipping to the floor, whimpering and vomiting up the smoke that had congealed in her stomach. She collapsed unconscious, overcome from the smoke, before she could reach the window to shout for help. Julie Goodyear later revealed that her night dress, supposedly fire-proofed, had in fact caught fire during filming of the scene, and she was in genuine danger. She said in the 2010 documentary Coronation Street - 50 Years, 50 Moments that "the scream at the top of the stairs was for real. I was terrified."

Kevin climbed up the ladder and arrived at the window - Ivy throwing a rag to him to protect him from the smoke and Terry throwing a brick to allow him to smash the window. Shouting to the rest of the residents that he could see Bet, he climbed in. Down below, the front windows of the pub exploded out into the Street, sending shocked residents screaming and running. As Kevin dragged Bet to the window, the Fire Brigade arrived to take over, with Terry advising the fire chief in charge of the operations where Bet and Kevin could be found, with the chief telling one of his personnel where the room in question was. Kevin escaped back down the ladder and the firemen took over the task of getting Bet out themselves, putting one of their oxygen masks over her face.

Bet was saved as heroic Kevin was led home, refusing to be taken to hospital. Vera Duckworth (Liz Dawn) had sarcastically suggested that the cause had been Bet smoking in bed, though Jack knew who was to blame. As Bet was led away in the ambulance she joked "Can you give me a minute, love, give me time to put my face on...?". Once the emergency services established everyone had been safely accounted for, they set about extinguishing the fire itself, starting with the main bar and working their way down to the cellar where the fire had originated. The Rovers was completely destroyed as the fire brigade and police examined the pub and quickly established the fire had been caused by an electrical fault after looking over the fuse box, and clear out the loose debris.

Breaking with convention, the episode ended not with Bet fighting for her life, which would have been the usual soap opera cliché, but the pub itself, which Newton and Ridley thought was not worth saving and intended to demolish.

Once the Rovers was renovated and refurbished, Bet pinned an electrician's number up on the board telling Jack to call upon the services of a professional, as they had the Rovers back, and she intended on keeping it.

The closing credits for this episode were particularly long, this was due to a pigeon being captured on the camera after the closing sequence was filmed. The sequence initially was to show workmen finishing boarding up the pub's doors and windows and taking the rubbish bags with much of the charred debris away. After the rubbish wagon drove off, the pigeon magically flew over the viaduct and landed on the blackened Rovers sign. The closing credits were extended to show this, with almost the entire theme tune being played, and delays between the last few credits, and shows the Rovers in a sorry state. The entire sequence was 1 minute 45 seconds, over twice as long as usual.

Ray Langton's death (2005)
In 2005, Ray Langton (Neville Buswell) returned to Coronation Street, where he died of stomach cancer. His death was the second death in the history of Coronation Street to take place inside The Rovers.

Dylan Wilson's birth (2008)
In February 2008, barmaid Violet Wilson (Jenny Platt) gave birth in the pub to Dylan who was fathered by gay barman Sean Tully (Antony Cotton). Landlady Liz McDonald (Beverley Callard), Eileen Grimshaw (Sue Cleaver) and Vernon Tomlin (Ian Reddington) were present at the birth. Sean's boyfriend, Marcus Dent (Charlie Condou), delivered the baby.

Cellar (2008)
Episode 6834, Transmitted: 6 June 2008

In June 2008, Steve McDonald (Simon Gregson) and Dan Mason (Matthew Crompton) became engaged in a petty feud. Steve believed that Dan scratched his car (the real culprit was Norris Cole (Malcolm Hebden) ), which resulted in Steve stealing Dan's mobile phone. At closing time, Dan went to the pub to confront Steve. He ended up hitting Steve by accident. Steve then struck Dan with a crate and threw the mobile down the cellar stairs. When Dan went to retrieve it, Steve locked him in the cellar. Dan, suffering pain from the blow of the crate, fell over in agony on the stairs. Steve, however, had already left and did not hear his shouts for help. The next day, Michelle Connor (Kym Marsh) found Dan and he was rushed to hospital. Steve was arrested for attempted murder and unlawful imprisonment.

Fire (2013)
On 18 March 2013, Karl Munro (John Michie) set fire to the pub's cellar to frame Jason Grimshaw (Ryan Thomas) but was caught by Sunita Alahan (Shobna Gulati) who was knocked unconscious by Karl when he fled to the Bistro to do his "Full Monty" act. Norris Cole (Malcolm Hebden) and Emily Bishop (Eileen Derbyshire) came into the restaurant to tell everyone about the fire, and Karl discovered Stella was upstairs in one of the pub's bedrooms so he went back in to save her.  As he got to her, the stairs collapsed, trapping them. Luckily Paul Kershaw (Tony Hirst) managed to get to them and got Stella out while his friend and fellow-firefighter Toni Griffiths (Tara Moran) got Karl out before the roof collapsed on top of her and killed her. Shortly afterwards the fire brigade arrived, put out the fire and were able to get Sunita out. The fire caused significant damage and caused financial problems for Stella meaning that she could not afford to hire Owen Armstrong (Ian Puleston-Davies) to do the refurb but after a failed attempt of offering Owen half the pub in exchange for the refurb, Stella's mother Gloria (Sue Johnston) paid him the £80,000 required to complete the work. Sunita was in a coma for a while and was killed by Karl when she began to recover. The Rovers re-opened on 26 May 2013.

Interior set
The Rovers Return set features walls and windows that can be removed to allow filming from different angles. There is a painted backdrop which looks over to the Metcalfes' house, Audrey's salon and the flat above the salon.

See also
 List of businesses in Weatherfield
 John Waite named his 1987 album Rover's Return after the famous meeting place.
 The Korgis also had an album track named Rover's Return on their 1980 album Dumb Waiters

Bibliography

 Little, Daran. Life and Times at 'The Rovers Return'''. Boxtree, 1994.
 Banham, Martin. The Cambridge Guide to Theatre''. Cambridge University Press, 1995. page 1067.

References

 The Daily Telegraph
 Globe and Mail
 The Mirror
 The Independent

Coronation Street
Rovers Return
Fictional elements introduced in 1960